Santo Stefano a Macerata is a village in Tuscany, central Italy, administratively a frazione of the comune of Cascina, province of Pisa. At the time of the 2001 census its population was 86.

The main hamlet of the frazione is called Chiesanuova.

Science 
The frazione is home to the European Gravitational Observatory and the Virgo interferometer, one of the few facilities in the world for the search for gravitational waves.

References

See also 
Virgo interferometer

Frazioni of the Province of Pisa